Lego Star Wars is a Lego theme that incorporates the Star Wars saga and franchise. Originally it was only licensed from 1999 to 2008, but The Lego Group extended the license with Lucasfilm, first until 2011, then until 2016, then again until 2022, and then once more until 2032. The brand has spawned an eponymous video game series containing six video games, developed by Traveller's Tales: Lego Star Wars: The Video Game (2005), Lego Star Wars II: The Original Trilogy (2006), Lego Star Wars: The Complete Saga (2007), Lego Star Wars III: The Clone Wars (2011), Lego Star Wars: The Force Awakens (2016) and Lego Star Wars: The Skywalker Saga (2022). Multiple short films and miniseries have also been produced.

Overview
Lego Star Wars is based on the Star Wars saga and franchise. The product line directly focuses on the Star Wars characters from the films and TV Series, with the exception of a few special characters.

Development
The Lego Star Wars designers have revealed how they have "changed strategy" to get popular minifigures into cheaper and more accessible sets. Lego Star Wars Creative Lead Jens Kronvold Frederiksen explained, "We have changed our strategy a little bit over the years," and continued, "Where in the past, we often kept some of them – the most important especially – for the higher prices, we are now thinking young kids, maybe newcomers to Star Wars, want to get into it."

The designers revealed the Force Ghost minifigures as a result of changes to the company’s transparent plastic. Creative Lead Jens Kronvold Frederiksen, "The reason for not doing it was that the minifigures are made out of many different types of plastic, because they need to have different abilities and characteristics," Design Director Michael Lee Stockwell explained, "Some have to be flexible, some need to use clutch power and whatnot," and continued, "So the hands are different material than the heads, for example."

Stockwell explained how coming up with playsets based on new shows and movies is trickier than creating vehicles. Referring to a Lego set based on The Mandalorian, Stockwell explained, "We were interested in [the Armourer’s forge] already from the first season, but we didn't know enough about the context," and continued, "We didn't know enough of what was happening around this. That's one of the major differences between designing a ship and a playset like this, because it's sometimes easier to understand a ship."

The designers explained the Mandalorian Starfighter (set number: 75316) is a great example of how they decide which sets to produce. Frederiksen explained, "If it's something that's exposed in more places, then there's a high chance that it's popular," and continued, "We did the same thing when creating stuff from The Clone Wars. We always thought the best set was [vehicles] that were both from the prequel movies, but also in The Clone Wars, [because] then we make more people happy."

The designers explained the design process of a minifigures and how they feel responsible for their accuracy. Lego Star Wars designer Madison O'Neil explained, "Part of that is just trying to fit these details in. The leg print, the arm print, wherever we can that's a new thing that we're starting to be able to do a little bit more of which is great to have the capacity to do that. We work within these frames that we have within the company that everyone has, and we just try to do the absolute best we can."

Construction sets

According to Bricklink, The Lego Group has released a total of 867 Lego sets and promotional polybags as part of Lego Star Wars theme.

The first few sets based on the original trilogy were released in 1999, coinciding with the release of The Phantom Menace. The first wave of Lego Star Wars sets included model 7140, an X-wing fighter. Sets based on the prequel trilogy (Episodes I to III) of Star Wars would follow, starting with Episode I – The Phantom Menace. As each new film in the prequel trilogy neared its release date, Lego issued new models of ships and scenes in those films, as well as additional sets from the original trilogy. Lego also produced models based on Clone Wars, The Clone Wars, The Old Republic, The Force Unleashed, Rebels, The Force Awakens, Battlefront, Rogue One, The Last Jedi, Solo, Resistance, The Mandalorian, The Rise of Skywalker, The Bad Batch, The Book of Boba Fett, Obi-Wan Kenobi, Star Wars: Andor, and Star Wars Jedi: Fallen Order. Sets based on Galaxy's Edge and The Freemaker Adventures have also been produced.

In 2022, The Lego Group announced the Lego Star Wars theme will continue until 2032.

Ultimate Collector Series (UCS) sets
In addition to the regular Minifigure-scale sets, Lego has released 37 sets for the Ultimate Collector Series. These models are often considerably larger, more detailed, and meant more for display purposes than other sets. They often cost more than regular Lego sets as well. Many of them include an information plaque and often a display stand. The largest of these is 75192, the 2017 UCS version of the Millennium Falcon, complete with ten Minifigures. At 7541 pieces, it is the largest Lego Star Wars set ever released; and the fifth largest set of any collection ever commercially released. On June 5, 2015, a sealed  box of the older 2007 Millennium Falcon Lego set (10179) was auctioned at online auction house Catawiki for 5000 euros (US$5556.5 at the time) making it the most expensive Lego set ever. In 2021, AT-AT (set number: 75313) was released on November 26, 2021. In 2022, Luke Skywalker’s Landspeeder (set number: 75341) was released on May 1, 2022. The Razor Crest (set number: 75331) was released on 3 October 2022.

Master Builder Series (MBS) sets 

With similar complexity to the Ultimate Collector Series sets, sets under the Master Builder Series are built with the purpose of playing, featuring numerous play features, functions, and interior details as compared to the UCS, which are meant more for display purposes. The first set of the MBS is the 75222 Betrayal at Cloud City, which was released in 2018. In 2020, 75290 Mos Eisley Cantina was released as the largest MBS set with over 3,000 pieces and 21 minifigures.

The Helmet Collection sets 
In 2020, Lego released three brick-built helmets of selected iconic characters from the Star Wars universe. They are 75277 Boba Fett, 75276 Stormtrooper, and 75274 TIE Fighter Pilot. Meant to be displayed, name plaques of the helmets' characters are included. In March 2021, Lego announced that it will be releasing helmets 75304 Darth Vader and 75305 Scout Trooper on April 26, 2021.

In February 2022, Lego announced that it will be releasing helmets 75327 Luke Skywalker (Red Five), 75328 The Mandalorian and 75343 Dark Trooper on March 1, 2022.

In January 2023, Lego announced that it will be releasing helmets 75351 Princess Leia (Boushh), 75349 Captain Rex and 75350 Clone Commander Cody on March 1, 2023.

Minifigures
The minifigure with the first code, i.e. sw0001, is a tan battle droid that appeared in The Phantom Menace. Some minifigures repeatedly appear across multiple Lego sets, while others can be very rare, vastly increasing their resale value. In 2019, the number of Lego Star Wars minifigures has surpassed 1000, with the Battlefront II protagonist Iden Versio bearing code sw1000.

R2-D2
Lego design master Kurt Kristiansen had revealed the R2-D2 (set number: 75308). Kurt Kristiansen explained, “Well R2-D2 is a bit of a fun thing for me cause I’ve been revisiting the design for almost 10 years,” and continued, “So it was quite a challenge to reinvent the model.”

Imperial Probe Droid
The designer video for Imperial Probe Droid (set number: 75306) explains some of the challenges that went into making the robotic model. Lego designer Jan Neergaard Olesen explained, “It’s the first model I made totally in 3d, we have a program that we use and this was the first model where I spent a lot of time building it in 3D at home,” and continued, “But the thing is, in 3D programs you don’t have gravity and with a model like this that have a very high pivot point, it’s going to cause some challenges”

Diorama Collection
In 2022, Lego announced that it will be releasing three Diorama building sets from the Star Wars universe on 24 March 2022. They are Death Star Trench Run Diorama, Dagobah Jedi Training Diorama and Death Star Trash Compactor Diorama.

Lego Art sets 

On August 1, 2020, Lego released 31200 Star Wars The Sith under the Lego Art theme. It consists of 3,406 pieces and offers builders the option to recreate any one of the three Star Wars villains (Darth Maul, Kylo Ren, and Darth Vader) in a mosaic-like format using Lego 1x1 studs.

Lego BrickHeadz sets 

Lego has since released 20 Star Wars themed sets under the Lego BrickHeadz theme. They include characters from the sequel trilogy, the original trilogy and The Mandalorian.

Lego Brick Sketches sets

First Order Stormtrooper and BB-8 were released as a part of Lego Brick Sketches theme.

Video games

Traveller's Tales president Jon Burton stated in a July 2008 interview with Variety that the series had collectively sold 15 million copies. As of February 13, 2009, Lego Star Wars: The Video Game has sold over 6.8 million copies worldwide, Lego Star Wars II has sold over 8.3 million, The Complete Saga has sold over 4.1 million, and the three combined have sold over 21 million. In May 2009, Wired reported combined sales of 20 million. As of 2012, all Lego Star Wars video games had collectively sold more than 30 million copies. As of 2016, more than 36 million games were sold. As of 2019, the series has sold more than 50 million copies of Lego Star Wars video games. In April 2022, Lego Star Wars: The Skywalker Saga was listed as one of the UK boxed chart top 10 by Eurogamer. Lego Star Wars: The Skywalker Saga has sold more than three million copies.

Films and videos 
Several films and videos based on Lego Star Wars have been produced; additionally, Lego Star Wars characters cameo in The Lego Movie (2014).

Short films
 Lego Star Wars: Revenge of the Brick is the first computer-animated Lego Star Wars short film. It premiered on Cartoon Network in mid-2005, in conjunction with the theatrical release of Revenge of the Sith.
 Lego Star Wars: The Quest for R2-D2 is a short movie which aired on Cartoon Network on August 2009, and was uploaded to the Lego Star Wars website, in order to celebrate 10 years of Lego Star Wars,
 Lego Star Wars: Bombad Bounty, is another CGI Lego short film, it was released in 2010. In it, Vader hires Boba Fett to track down the Gungan Jar Jar Binks for an accident he caused to Vader. The film also takes place at the same time as the original movies showing that Jar Jar was responsible for the destruction of the first Death Star and was with Boba Fett on Jabba's Barge during the events of Return of the Jedi.
 34 web shorts have been released on YouTube for the theme, several of which previously released elsewhere:

Television specials 
 Lego Star Wars: The Padawan Menace released on July 7, 2011, is a 30-minute, exclusive TV special written by Michael Price is about a Jedi Academy field trip. When Master Yoda leads a group of rambunctious Jedi younglings through Senate chambers when he senses a disturbance in the Force. Summoned to help save the Republic, he discovers that a young boy pretending to be a Jedi youngling secretly boarded his ship... and has a taste for adventure. Meanwhile, C-3PO and R2-D2 are put in charge of the boisterous group and find themselves in over their heads. Yoda and the droids proceed to save the younglings from Sith Lords as well as the vile Jabba the Hutt. The special premiered in the United States on Cartoon Network on July 22, 2011, at 7 p.m. and in the United Kingdom on October 17 at 5:30. The DVD and Blu-ray include several special features such as The Quest for R2-D2 and Bombad Bounty as well as other short films.
 Lego Star Wars: The Empire Strikes Out released on September 26, 2012, airing on Cartoon Network in the United States, and would be one of the last Star Wars productions to be made before Lucasfilm was sold to The Walt Disney Company a month later. In this special, Luke Skywalker embarks on a mission to find and destroy an Imperial base on Naboo, but is relentlessly chased by a group of fanatic fangirls, who think of him as a celebrity for destroying the Death Star. Meanwhile, Darth Vader engages a "sithling" rivalry with Darth Maul, in order to prove he's the best Sith Lord to Emperor Palpatine, who is constructing a second Death Star. The special was dedicated to Ralph McQuarrie, who worked on the original Star Wars trilogy who died before it was released.
 The Lego Star Wars Holiday Special was released on November 17, 2020, on Disney+, a spiritual successor to and satirisation of the Star Wars Holiday Special (1978). In the special, set after Episode IX, Rey begins to doubt her abilities as a teacher to Finn. She travels to a temple and finds a time key, which allows her to travel to different moments in time throughout the Star Wars saga to observe past Jedi Masters and their students. However, she loses the key to Emperor Palpatine and Darth Vader, who use it to go to the future, meeting Kylo Ren. After learning from him about his demise at Vader's hands, Palpatine seeks to make Kylo his new apprentice (unbeknownst to Vader) and ensure he will rule the galaxy forever. Meanwhile, Finn, Rose and Poe try to organize the perfect Life Day party, but chaos ensues at every step.
 Lego Star Wars: Terrifying Tales was released on October 1, 2021, exclusively on Disney+. In the special, set after Episode IX, Poe Dameron and BB-8 make an emergency landing on the volcanic planet Mustafar, where they meet Graballa the Hutt. The crime boss has purchased Darth Vader's castle and is renovating it into the galaxy's first all-inclusive Sith-inspired luxury hotel. While waiting for his X-Wing to be repaired, Poe, BB-8, Graballa, and Dean (a plucky and courageous young boy who works as Graballa's mechanic) venture deep into the mysterious castle with Vader's loyal servant, Vaneé. Along the way, Vaneé shares three creepy stories linked to ancient artifacts and iconic villains from across all eras of Star Wars. As Vaneé spins his tales and lures our heroes deeper into the shadowy underbelly of the castle, a sinister plan emerges. With the help of Dean, Poe and BB-8 will have to face their fears, stop an ancient evil from rising, and escape to make it back to their friends.
 Lego Star Wars: Summer Vacation was released on August 5, 2022, exclusively on Disney+.

Television series

 Lego Star Wars: The Yoda Chronicles consists of two seasons of half-hour episodes, released in 2013 and 2014 respectively. The first season is a three-episode Clone Wars-era story about a specialized clone trooper whom both the Sith and Jedi want on their side; he also appears in the four-episode second season, The New Yoda Chronicles, which focuses on Luke Skywalker and a showdown between him and Darth Vader before The Empire Strikes Back. The final episode also has an alternate-ending version on Disney+.
 Lego Star Wars: Droid Tales aired on Disney XD between July and November 2015, as a 5-part animated mini-series. The series serves as a comedic re-telling of the first six Star Wars films from C-3PO's point of view.
 Lego Star Wars: The Resistance Rises aired on Disney XD between February and May 2016, as a 5-part animated mini-series. The series serves as a comedic prequel to Star Wars: The Force Awakens.
 Lego Star Wars: The Freemaker Adventures aired on Disney XD. It was announced by Disney on February 17, 2016, as a new Lego animated series. Set between Episode V and Episode VI, it tells the story of the Freemakers, a family of scavengers that find themselves pulled into the conflict between the Rebels and the Empire.
 Lego Star Wars: All-Stars premiered on Disney XD on October 29, 2018. It consists of five half-hour episodes, the first of which is a compilation of eight separately-released short films. Set during multiple Star Wars eras, it tells the story of other relatives of the Freemaker family, including their parents Pace and Lena during the time of Solo, and Zander's daughter Moxie during Episode VII and Episode VIII.

Other merchandise
The Lego Star Wars brand has also produced Plush Toy Collection.

Reception 
In 2015, The Lego Group has seen its first half results jump 18 percent for 2015, fuelled by the popularity of Lego Star Wars, Lego Jurassic World and Lego Technic.

In 2018, the Toy Retailers Association listed BB-8 (set number: 75187) and Millennium Falcon (set number: 75192) on its official list of 2018 Toy of the Year Awards.

In 2020, Lego Star Wars theme became the Top-selling themes for the year.

In 2021, the Toy Retailers Association listed The Razor Crest (set number: 75292) on its official list of 2021 Toy of The Year Awards.

In June 2021, R2-D2 (set number: 75308) was listed as the "Top 20 Lego Sets List" by Lego fansite Brick Fanatics.

In 2020, The Lego Group reported that the Lego Technic, Lego Star Wars, Lego Classic, Lego Disney Princess, Lego Harry Potter and Lego Speed Champions, "The strong results are due to our incredible team," and that these themes had helped to push revenue for the first half of 2020 grow 7% to DKK 15.7 billion compared with the same period in 2019.

In 2021, Darth Vader Helmet (set number: 75304) was listed as one of the "Top 10 toys for Christmas 2021" by Tesco.

In March 2022, The Lego Group reported that the Lego City, Lego Technic, Lego Creator Expert, Lego Harry Potter and Lego Star Wars themes had earned for the full year of 2021. Revenue for the year grew 27 percent versus 2020 to DKK 55.3 billion and consumer sales grew 22 percent over the same period, outpacing the toy industry and driving market share growth globally and in largest markets.

On 28 September 2022, The Lego Group reported that the Lego Star Wars, Lego Technic, Lego Icons (formerly Creator Expert), Lego City, Lego Harry Potter and Lego Friends themes had earned for the six months ending 30 June 2022. Revenue for the period grew 17 percent to DKK 27.0 billion compared with the same period in 2021, driven by strong demand. Consumer sales grew 13 percent, significantly ahead of the toy industry, contributing to global market share growth.

In February 2023, Millennium Falcon (set number: 75192) and The Razor Crest (set number: 75331) were listed on "The biggest Lego sets of all time" by Lego fansite Brick Fanatics.

In March 2023, The Lego Group reported that the Lego City, Lego Technic, Lego Icons, Lego Harry Potter and Lego Star Wars themes had earned for the full year of 2022. Revenue for the year grew 17 percent to DKK 64.6 billion and consumer sales grew 12 percent in 2022, achieving growth in all major market groups with especially strong performance in the Americas and Western Europe.

Awards and nominations 
In 2006, Lego Star Wars was awarded "Toy of the Year" and also "Activity Toy of the Year" by the Toy Association.

In 2009, Darth Vadar's TIE Fighter (set number: 8017) and Echo Base (set number: 7749) were awarded "DreamToys" in the Construction category by the Toy Retailers Association.

In 2010, Hoth Wampa Cave (set number: 8089) was awarded "DreamToys" in the Boys category by the Toy Retailers Association.

In 2011, Millenium Falcon (set number: 7965) was awarded "DreamToys" in the Construction category by the Toy Retailers Association.

In 2012, Desert Skiff (set number: 9496) was awarded "DreamToys" in the Construction category by the Toy Retailers Association.

In 2015, Kylo Ren's Command Shuttle (set number: 75104) was awarded "DreamToys" in the Build It And They Will Thrive category by the Toy Retailers Association.

In 2016, U-Wing Fighter (set number: 75155) was awarded "DreamToys" in the Action Station category by the Toy Retailers Association.

In 2017, BB-8 (set number: 75187) and First Order Heavy Assault Walker (set number: 75189) were awarded "DreamToys" in the Licensed To Thrill category by the Toy Retailers Association.

In 2018, BB-8 (set number: 75187) was awarded "Toy of the Year" and also "Construction Toy of the Year" by the Toy Association. Also Millennium Falcon (set number: 75192) was awarded "Toy of the Year" and also "Specialty Toy of the Year" by the Toy Association.

In 2019, Yoda (set number: 75255) was awarded "DreamToys" in the Movie Magic category by the Toy Retailers Association.

In 2020, 501st Legion Clone Troopers (set number: 75280) was awarded "DreamToys" in the Licensed To Thrill category by the Toy Retailers Association.

In 2020, Droid Commander (set number: 75253) was awarded "Toy of the Year" and also "STEM/STEAM Toy of the Year" by the Toy Association.

In 2021, Boba Fett's Starship (set number: 75312) (set number: 75280) was awarded "DreamToys" in the Licensed To Thrill category by the Toy Retailers Association.

In 2022, Boba Fett's Starship (set number: 75312) was awarded "Toy of the Year" and also "Playset of the Year" by the Toy Association.

In 2022, Hoth AT-ST (set number: 75322) was awarded "DreamToys" in the Film & TV Favourites and The Top 12 Toys for Christmas 2022 categories by the Toy Retailers Association. Dark Trooper Attack (set number: 75324) was awarded "DreamToys" in the Film & TV Favourites category by the Toy Retailers Association.

See also
 Lego Indiana Jones
 The Lego Movie
 Lego Games

References

Further reading 
 Lego Star Wars Brickmaster. Published by Dorling Kindersley, 2010. 
 Lego Star Wars Character Encyclopedia. Published by Dorling Kindersley, 2011. 
 Lego Star Wars: Anakin: Space Pilot: Space Pilot (3d). Authored by Ace Landers and Dave White. Published by Scholastic, 2011. 
 Lego Star Wars Heroes Ultimate Sticker Book. Authored by Shari Last. Published by Dorling Kindersley, 2011. 
 Lego Star Wars Villains Ultimate Sticker Book. Authored by Shari Last. Published by Dorling Kindersley, 2011. 
 DK Readers L2: Lego Star Wars: The Phantom Menace. Authored by Hannah Dolan. Published by Dorling Kindersley, 2012. 
 Ultimate Sticker Collection: Lego (R) Star Wars: Minifigures: More Than 1,000 Reusable Full-Color Stickers. Authored by Shari Last. Published by Dorling Kindersley, 2012. 
 LEGO Star Wars Brickmaster Battle for the Stolen Crystals. Published by Dorling Kindersley, 2013. 
 DK Readers L2: Lego Star Wars: Attack of the Clones. Authored by Elizabeth Dowsett. Published by Dorling Kindersley, 2013. 
 DK Readers L3: Lego Star Wars: Revenge of the Sith. Authored by Elizabeth Dowsett. Published by Dorling Kindersley, 2013. 
 Lego Star Wars: A New Hope. Authored by Emma Grange. Published by Dorling Kindersley, 2014. 
 Lego Star Wars: The Empire Strikes Back. Authored by Emma Grange. Published by Dorling Kindersley, 2014. 
 Lego Star Wars: Return of the Jedi. Authored by Emma Grange. Published by Dorling Kindersley, 2014. 
 Lego Star Wars Character Encyclopedia, Updated and Expanded: With Minifigure. Authored by Hannah Dolan and Shari Last. Published by Dorling Kindersley, 2015. 
 Lego Star Wars: Yoda Chronicles Trilogy No Level. Authored by Ace Landers. Published by Scholastic, 2015. 
 Lego Star Wars: Padawan Menace No Level. Authored by Ace Landers. Published by Scholastic, 2015. 
 Lego Star Wars: The Force Awakens. Authored by David Fentiman. Published by Dorling Kindersley, 2016. 
 Lego Star Wars Tales of Rebellion. Authored by Ace Landers. Published by Scholastic, 2016. 
 Ultimate LEGO Star Wars : Includes two exclusive prints. Authored by Chris Malloy and Andrew Becraft. Published by Dorling Kindersley, 2017. 
 DK Readers L2: Lego Star Wars: The Last Jedi. Published by Dorling Kindersley, 2019. 
 Lego Star Wars Visual Dictionary, New Edition : With exclusive Finn minifigure. Published by Dorling Kindersley, 2019. 
 Lego Star Wars Character Encyclopedia New Edition : With Exclusive Darth Maul Minifigure. Authored by Elizabeth Dowsett. Published by Dorling Kindersley, 2020. 
 DK Readers Level 2: Lego Star Wars the Rise of Skywalker. Authored by Ruth Amos. Published by Dorling Kindersley, 2020. 
 Lego Star Wars Holiday Sticker Book. Authored by Tori Kosara. Published by Dorling Kindersley, 2020. 
 Lego Star Wars Yoda's Galaxy Atlas. Authored by Simon Hugo. Published by Dorling Kindersley, 2021. 
 Lego Star Wars Awesome Vehicles : With Poe Dameron Minifigure and Accessory. Authored by Simon Hugo. Published by Dorling Kindersley, 2022.

External links

 
 Brickset: Your Lego Set Guide
 MiniFigs.nl Lego Star Wars minifigs
 

 
Star Wars
Star Wars merchandise
Products introduced in 1999
Star Wars
Action-adventure video games by series
Video game franchises introduced in 2005